Leonardo "Leo" Andrés Mainoldi, (born March 4, 1985), is an Argentine  professional basketball player. He plays at the power forward position.

Professional career
On September 1, 2013, Mainoldi signed a one-year deal with the Spanish EuroLeague club Laboral Kutxa.

National team career
Mainoldi has been a member of the senior men's Argentina national basketball team. He won the bronze medal at the 2009 FIBA Americas Championship, the bronze medal at the 2013 FIBA Americas Championship, and the silver medal at the 2015 FIBA Americas Championship.

He also played at the 2016 Summer Olympics.

Honors and awards
Ford Burgos
Spanish 3rd Division Champion
2006
Spanish 3rd Cup Winner
2006

Plus Pujol Lleida
Catalan 2nd Division Champion
2007

Argentine national team
South American Under-21 Championship: 
2004
South American Championship: 
2006
South American Championship: 
2008
FIBA Americas Championship: 
2009
South American Championship: 
2010
FIBA Americas Championship: 
2013
FIBA Americas Championship: 
2015

Personal life
Leonardo has an older brother, Carlos, who is also a professional basketball player.

References

External links
Twitter 
FIBA Profile
FIBA Europe Profile
Euroleague.net Profile
Eurobasket.com Profile
NBADraft.net Profile
Spanish League Profile 

Living people
1985 births
AB Castelló players
Argentine expatriate basketball people in Spain
Argentine men's basketball players
Argentine people of Italian descent
Baloncesto Fuenlabrada players
Basketball players at the 2007 Pan American Games
Basketball players at the 2016 Summer Olympics
Club San Martín de Corrientes basketball players
Gimnasia y Esgrima de Comodoro Rivadavia basketball players
Italian men's basketball players
Liga ACB players
Olympic basketball players of Argentina
Power forwards (basketball)
Quimsa basketball players
Saski Baskonia players
Valencia Basket players
Pan American Games competitors for Argentina
Sportspeople from Santa Fe Province